The canton of Ouzom, Gave et Rives du Neez is an administrative division of the Pyrénées-Atlantiques department, southwestern France. It was created at the French canton reorganisation which came into effect in March 2015. Its seat is in Nay.

It consists of the following communes:
 
Aressy
Arros-de-Nay
Arthez-d'Asson
Assat
Asson
Baliros
Bosdarros
Bourdettes
Bruges-Capbis-Mifaget
Gan
Haut-de-Bosdarros
Meillon
Narcastet
Nay
Pardies-Piétat
Rontignon
Saint-Abit
Uzos

References

Cantons of Pyrénées-Atlantiques